Majiapu Subdistrict is a subdistrict on the eastern part of Fengtai District, Beijing, China. It borders Xiluoyuan Subdistrict to the north, Xiluoyuan and Dahongmen Subdistricts to the east, Nanyuan Township to the south, Xincun Subdistrict and Huaxiang Township to the west. As of 2020, it has a total population of 111,470.

The name of the subdistrict, Majiapu, is from a tavern that was owned by Ma brothers around the end of Ming dynasty. It came to be known as Majiapu as it developed during the reign of Qianlong Emperor, and the name was later corrupted to Majiapu.

History

Administrative Division 
As of 2021, there are 16 residential communities under Majiapu Subdistrict, and they are listed as follows:

See also 

 List of township-level divisions of Beijing

References 

Fengtai District
Subdistricts of Beijing